Frederick Boreham (8 July 1885 – 1951) was an English professional footballer who played for Tunbridge Wells Rangers, Tottenham Hotspur and Leyton.

Football career 
After spells with Tunbridge Wells Rangers and Leyton, Boreham joined Tottenham Hotspur. The goalkeeper played a total of 20 matches for the "Lilywhites" between 1908–09. He returned to Leyton where he ended his career.

References 

1885 births
1951 deaths
People from Rye, East Sussex
Association football goalkeepers
English footballers
English Football League players
Tottenham Hotspur F.C. players
Leyton F.C. players
Tunbridge Wells F.C. players